In enzymology, an inositol 4-methyltransferase is an enzyme that catalyzes the chemical reaction

S-adenosyl-L-methionine + myo-inositol  S-adenosyl-L-homocysteine + 1D-4-O-methyl-myo-inositol

Thus, the two substrates of this enzyme are S-adenosyl methionine and myo-inositol, whereas its two products are S-adenosylhomocysteine and 1D-4-O-methyl-myo-inositol.

This enzyme belongs to the family of transferases, specifically those transferring one-carbon group methyltransferases.  The systematic name of this enzyme class is S-adenosyl-L-methionine:1D-myo-inositol 4-methyltransferase. Other names in common use include myo-inositol 4-O-methyltransferase, S-adenosyl-L-methionine:myo-inositol 4-O-methyltransferase, and myo-inositol 6-O-methyltransferase.

References

 
 

EC 2.1.1
Enzymes of unknown structure
Inositol